Koumac  is a commune in the North Province of New Caledonia, an overseas territory of France in the Pacific Ocean.

History
On 5 January 1977 about 46% of the territory of Koumac was detached and became the commune of Poum.

Climate 
Koumac has a tropical savanna climate (Köppen Aw), although there is still some rain in the dry season which peaks between July and October.

Famous people
Athlete Arnjolt Beer was born here.

References

Communes of New Caledonia